Square Butte is a  sandstone summit located on Navajo Nation land, in Coconino County of northern Arizona. Square Butte is known as Tsé Dikʼání in Navajo language, meaning "square rock." Its nearest higher neighbor is White Mesa,  to the south. Precipitation runoff from Square Butte drains to northwest into Square Butte Wash or northeast into Potato Canyon, then ultimately Lake Powell, all part of the Colorado River drainage basin. According to the Köppen climate classification system, Square Butte is located in an arid climate zone with hot, very dry summers, and chilly winters. Spring and fall are the most favorable seasons to visit. The top of Square Butte is composed of Entrada Sandstone including the Cow Springs Member, and it overlays Carmel Formation, all of which was deposited in the Jurassic period.

See also
 Colorado Plateau
 List of rock formations in the United States

Gallery

References

External links
 Weather forecast: National Weather Service
 Weather: Square Butte

Colorado Plateau
Landforms of Coconino County, Arizona
Geography of the Navajo Nation
North American 2000 m summits
Sandstone formations of the United States